Ross Braude (born 18 January 2000) is a Canadian rugby union player, currently playing for the Toronto Arrows of Major League Rugby (MLR) and the Canadian national team. His preferred position is scrum-half.

Professional career
Braude signed for Major League Rugby side Toronto Arrows for the 2021 Major League Rugby season. Braude made his debut for Canada in the 2021 July rugby union tests.

References

External links
itsrugby.co.uk Profile

2000 births
Living people
Canadian rugby union players
Canada international rugby union players
Rugby union scrum-halves
Toronto Arrows players
Rugby sevens players at the 2018 African Youth Games